Livensky (masculine), Livenskaya (feminine), or Livenskoye (neuter) is the name of several rural localities in Russia:
Livenskoye, Kaliningrad Oblast, a settlement in Alexeyevsky Rural Okrug of Krasnoznamensky District of Kaliningrad Oblast
Livenskoye, Tula Oblast, a village in Prilepsky Rural Okrug of Leninsky District of Tula Oblast
Livenskaya, a village in Bolkhovskoy Selsoviet of Zadonsky District of Lipetsk Oblast